Paul Wolff is an American electronics engineer and entrepreneur, who is a designer of professional audio recording equipment. He designs recording consoles including immersive and audio mixing equipment for professional recording. He has been associated with companies including Datatronix, API, Tonelux, and Fix Audio Designs. His customers include Jim Messina, Jimmy Jam and Terry Lewis, and Startec Studios, among others.

Wolff was inducted into the TEC Awards Hall of Fame for his creation of the API Lunchbox. He is a frequent speaker on panels for AES.

Early life
Wolff was born in Traverse City, Michigan the son of Gene and Pat (née Kasler). He has a brother Glenn and sister Lisa. Both his parents were musicians. His paternal grandfather, Albert Wolff, served as an artilleryman in World War I.  He was part of a military review of 250 of the tallest American soldiers chosen to form an honor guard for King George V and received a personal letter of commendation from the King upon his return to America.

Pat Wolff wrote "I Ran Away With An All-Girl Band" a book about her time in the all-female swing band Victory Sweethearts.

He began his career as the Sound Engineer front of house sound engineer for the Washington, D.C. night club The Bayou, for performers including Foreigner, Pat Benatar, Dire Straits and others.

Associated companies

Datatronix and API 
In 1978, Wolff began his start in the console business at Datatronix just after the company had acquired Automated Processes, Inc., known as API.  In 1985 Wolff, purchased API, the audio assets of Datatronix that were put up for sale.  Upon its acquisition, for legal reasons not being able to use the original name of the company, he renamed it "API Audio Products".

Among his customers was Startec, Washington, D.C., who opened a new 24-track facility in 1983 with a custom built API console.

Manufacturing consoles, in 1987 as President of API, Wolff announced successful conversion of manufacturing the 2520 op-amp to an automated assembly  "drastically reduces costs without affecting the sound at all".

In 1999, upon the sale of API Audio Products to the ATI Group, best known as manufacturers of public address consoles, they incorporated under the original "Automated Processes" name.

In 2003, as director of engineering Wolff designed the Vision console with input from Galaxy Studios' head engineer Ronald Prent, upon Prent's request for a custom-built six-channel version of API'S two-channel 2500 mastering compressor. In August 2003, the first Vision Surround Mixing Console was installed in Belgium's Galaxy Studios.

Lunchbox 
Around 1985 after Aphex discontinued the 500 series rack, Wolff, as new owner of API, received approval from Marvin Caesar, president of Aphex, to make the 500 series Lunchbox.  At that time, the Lunchbox was in a 4-slot format.  The name "Lunchbox" was coined by Art Kelm as he had been buying the original boxes from Aphex and calling them lunchboxes.

Tonelux 
Wolff founded Tonelux Designs Ltd, manufacturing modular recording equipment and became owner and designer. He subsequently sold the company to PMI Audio Group in March 2010.

Fix Audio Designs, Slate Media 
Wolff joined Slate Media Technology Team as a Hardware Design Specialist on the RAVEN Multi-Touch Console series, Slate Monitor Controller and VMS-1 Mic Preamplifier.

In 2015, Wolff created Fix Audio Designs.

Work with Jim Messina 
In September 2015, Wolff co-produced and recorded Jim Messina's live shows for his "In The Groove" album.  Recording locations included the Lobero Theatre in Santa Barbara, California and the Clark Center for the Performing Arts in Arroyo Grande, California.

Wolff was quoted as saying "I streamed it live with HD video, while mixing front of house, while mixing front row seats, while mixing mono mix for the monitor guy, while mixing side fills, while tracking. We took two nights and mixed for three months...."

References

External links
 
 
 
 https://player.fm/series/series-2407934/ep-42-drivin-the-train-with-paul-wolff
 https://bobbyowsinskiblog.com/2017/04/21/episode-157-paul-wolff/
 Sunset Sound Audio Engineer Paul Wolff "The Greatest Audio Podcast Ever" on YouTube

Manufacturers of professional audio equipment
Immersive audio engineers
Year of birth missing (living people)
Living people
American audio engineers